New Akina Etranger is the fourth studio album by Japanese singer Akina Nakamori. It was released on August 10, 1983 under the Warner Pioneer label. It was Nakamori's first album to receive an award for The Album of the Year in the 25th Japan Record Awards.

Background
New Akina Etranger is the second studio album released in 1983, five months after the release of the album Fantasy.

The music production team consists of collaborators who produced music for the former idol singer, Momoe Yamaguchi, such as Mitsuo Hagita, Shinji Tanimura and Yoko Aki along with previous collaborators such as Takao and Etsuko Kisugi, Masao Urino and Haruomi Hosono.

It's Nakamori's first album which doesn't include any single tracks. All 10 tracks are newly recorded album tracks.

Promotion

Drama theme song
Sukoshi Dake no Scandal was promoted as the theme song to the japanese television drama Ruriiro Generation, which was broadcast on  Nippon TV.

Music Home Video
On December 12, 1983, the music home video New Akina Etranger in Europe was released. It's Nakamori's first video release to be published. The music videoclips were filmed in various places of Europe, such as Paris, Geneva and Rome. Aside of the album tracks, it also includes a filmed recording of the single Kinku, which wasn't released in the original album but instead to the first compilation album Best Akina Memorial.

Stage performances
Nakamori performed most of the songs from the album at her Rainbow Shower live tour in 1983, such as Sayonara ne, Sukoshi dake Scandal, Stripe, Wakurabairo no Love Song and Toki ni wa Ennui.

She performed Venus Tanjou at her first dinner show Dinner Show 1996: An evening with Miss Akina Nakamori.

Chart performance
The album reached number one on the Oricon Album Weekly Chart for two consecutive weeks, charted 16 weeks and sold over 482,100 copies. The album was ranked at number 10 on the Oricon Album Yearly Chart in 1983. In December of 1983 it was nominated in 25th Japan Record Awards and won the title The Album of the Year.

Track listing
All tracks are arranged by Mitsuo Hagita, except "Mon Amour (Glass ni Hanbun no Tasogare)" by Haruomi Hosono.

References

1983 albums
Akina Nakamori albums
Warner Music Japan albums
Japanese-language albums